"Acelera Aê (Noite do Bem)" is a song performed by the Brazilian recording artist Ivete Sangalo, taken from her third live album Multishow ao Vivo: Ivete Sangalo no Madison Square Garden. Written by Gigi, Magno Sant'Anna, Fabinho O'Brian e Dan Kambaiah, the song is an axé pop song, that talks about getting ready for a great event. It was released as the album's lead single on August 20, 2010, in the digital download format in many countries, such as Brazil, Belgium and Portugal. The song reach number ten on the Brazilian charts.

Critical reception
Jon Pareles from The New York Times gave a favorable review to the song, by saying: "A new song, "Aceleraê" ("Acceleration"), promised to dance all night: "Today is the day of Ivete!" the lyrics proclaimed."

Awards
The song received a nomination at the Latin Grammy Awards of 2011 in the category "Best Brazilian Song".

Music video
The video was released on November 3, 2010, and it shows Ivete performing the song on the Madison Square Garden stage. It was directed by Nick Wickham.

Charts

Release history 

Ivete Sangalo songs
2010 singles
2010 songs
Universal Music Group singles